Jeremy Andrew Harris,  (born 5 April 1965), is the current Commissioner of the Garda Síochána in the Republic of Ireland, having assumed office in September 2018. He previously served as Deputy Chief Constable of the Police Service of Northern Ireland (PSNI) from 2014 to 2018.

Biography
Harris joined the Royal Ulster Constabulary (RUC) in 1983, rising to become Deputy Chief Constable of the PSNI in October 2014.

His father, Alwyn Harris, a senior RUC officer was murdered by the Provisional IRA in 1989.

Following an international selection process, which included a salary increase to €250,000 to attract interest, Harris was announced as the new Garda Commissioner on 26 June 2018, becoming the first Commissioner to be appointed from outside the Garda Síochána. He took over the leadership of the Garda Síochána from Dónall Ó Cualáin, who had served as acting Garda Commissioner since the resignation of Nóirín O'Sullivan in September 2017, following a number of Garda scandals. His appointment as Garda Commissioner is for five years.

He is married with four children and holds a master's degree in Criminology from the University of Cambridge. He is a Protestant.

References

1965 births
Living people
Alumni of the University of Cambridge
Garda Commissioners
Police Service of Northern Ireland officers
Royal Ulster Constabulary officers
British police chief officers
Police officers from Belfast
Officers of the Order of the British Empire
Northern Irish recipients of the Queen's Police Medal